The Sasak people live mainly on the island of Lombok, Indonesia, numbering around 3.6 million (85% of Lombok's population). They are related to the Balinese in language and ancestry, although the Sasak are predominantly Muslim while the Balinese are predominantly Hindu. Sasak people who practice pre-Islamic beliefs are also known as Sasak Boda in reference to the name of the Sasak people's original religion, Bodha.

Etymology
There is a possibility that the origin of the name Sasak came from the word sak-sak, which means "boat". In the Nagarakretagama, the word Sasak is mentioned together as one with Lombok Island, namely Lombok Sasak Mirah Adhi. According to local tradition, it is believed that the word Sasak came from sa'-saq which means "the one". Followed by the word Lombok which originates from the word Lomboq, meaning "straight". Hence by combining the words together Sa'-saq Lombok, it means "something that's straight". Other translations also includes "a straight road". Lombok Sasak Mirah Adhi is taken from the Nagarakretagama (Desawarnana) literature, a scripture written by Mpu Prapanca that records the power and rule of the Majapahit kingdom. The word Lombok in Kawi means "straight" or "honest", Mirah means "gem", Sasak means "statement", and Adhi means "something that's good" or "utmost". Therefore Lombok Sasak Mirah Adhi means "honesty is the gem that states out goodness".

History

Little is known about Sasak history except that Lombok was placed under direct rule of the Majapahit prime Minister, patih Gajah Mada. Islam arrived into the area around the 15th century. The Sasaks converted to Islam between the late 16th century to early 17th century under the influence of Pangeran Prapen (Sunan Prapen), the son of Raden Paku (Sunan Giri) or Sunan Giri himself and the Muslim Makassarese, frequently mixing basic Islamic beliefs with Hindu-Buddhist beliefs, thus creating the Wetu Telu religion. Lombok was conquered by the Gelgel Balinese kingdom in the early 16th century, thus bringing a large population of Balinese to Lombok. The Balinese population of Lombok today is about 300,000, 10–15% of Lombok's population. The Balinese have also strongly influenced the Wetu Telu religion of Lombok.

Language 

The Sasak language is an Austronesian language that belongs to the group of Indonesian type language. Specifically, Sasak belongs to the languages of Western Indonesia which also means it is  closely related to the languages of Java and  Bali. There are also a number of Sasak dialect in various regions such as Kuto-Kute (North Sasak), Meno-Mene (Central Sasak), Meriak-Meriku (Central South Sasak), Ngeno-Ngene (Central East Sasak, Central West Sasak), Ngeto-Ngete (Northeast Sasak) and so on.

Religion

According to the Babad Lombok, an account of the history of the Sasak people, they were first introduced to Islam by Sunan Prapen, who invaded Lombok and forced much of the people to convert to Islam. This conversion was only nominal, and as soon as he left most converted back to Hinduism. Upon hearing this Prapen returned to Lombok with the support of the Raden of Sumuliya and the Raden of Salut and succeeded. It was observed that a part of the people fled into the mountains, now called the Bodhas, while the rest were subjected to Muslim rule and converted. This record is supported by anthropological observations, such as the fact that the Bodhas point to central plain villages as their homeland, and make pilgrimage there.

Most of the Sasaks today are adherents of the Lima Waktu version of Islam. Lima Waktu or Five Times signifies the five daily prayers which Muslims are required to do.

The term Lima Waktu is used to distinguish them from the Sasaks who are practitioners of Wetu Telu or Three Symbols who only pray three times a day. Orthodox Islamic teachers generally instruct adherents to pray five times a day.

Large numbers of people adhering to the Wetu Telu faith can be still found throughout the island, especially in the village of Bayan, where the religion originated. Large Wetu Telu communities can be still found in Mataram, Pujung, Sengkol, Rambitan, Sade, Tetebatu, Bumbung, Sembalun, Senaru, Loyok and Pasugulan. A small minority of Sasaks called the Bodha (estimated population: 8,000) are mainly found in the village of Bentek and on the slopes of Gunung Rinjani. They are totally untouched by Islamic influence and worship animistic gods, incorporating some Hindu and Buddhist influences in their rituals and religious vocabulary. This group of Sasak, due in part to the name of their tribe, are recognized as Buddhists by the Indonesian government.

The Bodha have the same magico-religious officials and institutions as the Wetu Telu (with the exception of course of the Kiyai, the Wetu Telu religious official dealing with all aspects of the Wetu Telu religion which mixes Islam and animism). The Bodhas recognize the existence of five main gods, the highest of which is Batara Guru, followed by Batara Sakti and Batara Jeneng with their wives Idadari Sakti and Idadari Jeneng, though they also believe in spirits and ghosts. The Bodha religion is also to some extent influenced by both Hindu and Buddhist concepts. Of late, many of them have embraced Theravada Buddhism due to the effort and support from Buddhist missionaries.

Art performances 
 Gandrung
 Gendang beleq

See also

 Sasak architecture

References

External links 
 Sidetrip to Lombok by the New York Times

Ethnic groups in Indonesia
Lombok
Indigenous peoples of Southeast Asia
Muslim communities of Indonesia